The 1956 United States presidential election in Missouri took place on November 6, 1956, as part of the 1956 United States presidential election. Voters chose 13 representatives, or electors, to the Electoral College, who voted for president and vice president.

Democrat Adlai Stevenson II narrowly won the state of Missouri over the Republican incumbent, Dwight D. Eisenhower, thanks in large part to a 72,000-vote margin in St. Louis. This election saw the state deviate from its traditional status as a national bellwether; except for this election, Missouri chose the eventual winner of each U.S. presidential contest from 1904 to 2004. Missouri was the only state Eisenhower won in 1952 that Stevenson managed to flip. As of 2020, this was the last election in which the Republican nominee won the presidency without carrying Missouri. This was also the only state outside the old Confederacy that Stevenson managed to win.

Results

Results by county

See also
 United States presidential elections in Missouri

Notes

References

Missouri
1956
1956 Missouri elections